The Ennis House is a residential dwelling in the Los Feliz neighborhood of Los Angeles, California, United States, south of Griffith Park. The home was designed by Frank Lloyd Wright for Charles and Mabel Ennis in 1923 and was built in 1924.

Following La Miniatura in Pasadena, and the Storer and Freeman Houses in the Hollywood Hills of Los Angeles, the structure is the fourth and largest of Wright's textile block designs, constructed primarily of interlocking pre-cast concrete blocks, in the northern Los Angeles area.

The design is based on ancient Maya temples, and along with other buildings by Frank Lloyd Wright, such as the A. D. German Warehouse in Wisconsin and Aline Barnsdall Hollyhock House in Hollywood, the Ennis House is sometimes referred to as an example of the Mayan Revival architecture. Its prominent detail is the relief ornamentation on its 27,000 perforated and patterned decomposed granite blocks, inspired by the symmetrical reliefs of Puuc architecture in Uxmal.

The Ennis House is a designated city, state, and national landmark. From 2011 until 2019, it was owned by billionaire Ronald Burkle, during which time significant repairs and renovations were made. The house sold for US$18 million in 2019 to couple Robert Rosenheck and Cindy Capobianco, cannabis industry professionals and philanthropists.

History
The house consists of two buildings, the main house and a smaller chauffeur's apartment/garage, separated by a paved courtyard. The kitchen, pantry, guest room, dining room, living room, master bathroom and bedroom, upper terrace, and second bathroom and bedroom are at the eastern and lower end of the main building.

Construction difficulties brought up costs. Initially supervised by Frank Lloyd Wright's son Lloyd Wright, the owners took over construction supervision after the superstructure reached the windows. They carried out various changes, deviating from Wright's original design.

In 1940, the house was sold to media personality John Nesbitt, who had Wright add a pool on the north terrace, a billiard room on the ground floor, and a heating system.

Although originally and currently known as the Ennis House, the building was long known as the Ennis-Brown House, which became its name in 1980 — in appreciation of its donation to the Trust for Preservation of Cultural Heritage by Augustus O. Brown, the eighth owner of the house (1968–1980). In August 2005, the house was returned to its original name, and the Trust for Preservation of Cultural Heritage was renamed the Ennis House Foundation.

It was during the long ownership by the Foundation from 1980 to 2011 that the house was used as a filming location, establishing it as one of the most famous houses in Los Angeles.

On June 19, 2009, the Ennis House Foundation announced that the house was being offered for sale with an asking price of US$15 million. Finding no buyers in a down economy, the price was steadily reduced, until it was sold to business executive Ron Burkle for just under $4.5 million on July 14, 2011. A condition of the sale is an easement that allows public viewing 12 days per year, a condition binding on subsequent buyers. By December 2018, it was listed for sale at $23 million. In 2019, Burkle sold the house for $18 million.

Restoration

Even before its completion the Ennis House was marked by structural instability. Concrete blocks had cracked and lower sections of the walls buckled under tension. The use of decomposed granite from the site to color the textile blocks introduced natural impurities to the concrete mix, and combined with air pollution caused premature decay. Attempts to apply a protective coating caused additional problems.

More damage occurred due to the 1994 Northridge earthquake and the record precipitation during the 2004–2005 rainy season. The Ennis House Foundation had estimated that it could cost US$5 million just to stabilize the building, and US$15 million for full restoration. After the rains the building was briefly red-tagged as "no entry" but was down graded to yellow- for limited entry by late 2005. At that point significant damage to the retaining wall at the southern rear of the building remained. In 2005 the house was added to the National Trust for Historic Preservation's list of the "11 Most Endangered Historic Places".

In 2006 a Federal Emergency Management Agency (FEMA) grant was issued, as well as a US$4.5 million construction loan through First Republic Bank, which restarted restoration efforts. The project included a new structural support system, restoration or replacement of damaged blocks, restoration of windows, and a new roof. Restoration work was completed in 2007 at a cost of nearly US$6.4 million. No announcement was made regarding access by the public and the Ennis House remains closed to public visitors.

Use in film productions

The building's exotic design has made it an appealing location for Hollywood filmmakers.

Although used as a shooting location as early as 1933 (Female), the house first acquired morbid fame providing the exterior facade for House on Haunted Hill, a 1959 B movie. The 1975 film The Day of the Locust made extensive use of the house as a private residence, but it was in 1982's Blade Runner that the house gained a popularity of its own among moviegoers; only the main character's arrival at the motor court was actually shot at the Ennis House, but casts were taken of the textile blocks and these were used to construct interior sets on soundstages. Its exterior also appears as "The Mansion" occupied by Angelus, Spike, and Drusilla in the television series Buffy the Vampire Slayer.

Sections of the cathedral reminiscent interior, especially the elevated dining room and fireplace, have appeared in over a dozen films including The Karate Kid Part III revealing the view of downtown Los Angeles, Black Rain, The Glimmer Man, The Replacement Killers, Rush Hour substituting for a floor of a Hong Kong skyscraper, and The Thirteenth Floor.

The house has also been used as a location for commercials, fashion magazine shoots and music videos, including 3T's "Why" featuring Michael Jackson. S Club 7's video for the single "Have You Ever" shows the band members living an everyday life in the house and Ricky Martin music video song "Vuelve".

Impressed by the house, filmmakers either recreated original elements of the Ennis House on sound stage sets or vaguely imitated these as in Predator 2 and several episodes of Star Trek: The Next Generation. After shooting the exterior scene on location for Blade Runner, the interior of Deckard's apartment was created at Warner Brothers. In the case of The Rocketeer, sections of the Ennis House were recreated in detail, including the patterned art glass, on a studio set. The Rocketeer went as far as adding an upper floor. On a smaller scale, tile casts of the block relief ornamentation were used for the Club Silencio doorframe in Mulholland Drive. David Lynch used the interiors of Ennis House for a few segments of the show Twin Peaks in which the soap opera show-within-a-show called Invitation to Love. The house has also appeared in episodes of HBO's television update of Westworld and the 2019 mini-series I Am the Night.

A cartoon representation is featured in South Park as the base of a Chinese gang in the episode "Wing", satirizing the popular association of the Ennis House with criminal and/or Asian characters in films.

Because the house is situated in a densely populated neighborhood, tensions have arisen over the years in regard to film production crews, as well as the streams of tourists and restoration construction workers.

A film documenting the house, called The Ennis House, was shot in hi definition digital 3D by film maker Tom Koester. It covers the construction (briefly), a grand tour of the house (closed to the public), and the damage stemming from the 1994 earthquake and the subsequent restoration and repair prior to the sale of the house to its current private owner. An early cut of the film premiered at the Frank Lloyd Wright Building Conservancy Conference in Chicago, October 2007, but has had few public showings. It is available on DVD in both 2D and 3D versions.

The Ennis House was also featured in the Thirty Seconds to Mars documentary Artifact, where part of their album This Is War was recorded.

Landmark status
The house was included as one of the top ten houses of all time in Los Angeles Times, in a survey of experts in December 2008, and is listed on the Department of the Interior, National Register of Historic Places, and the National Trust for Historic Preservation list of Endangered Historic Places, and is a designated California Historical Landmark, and a Los Angeles Historic-Cultural Monument.

California Historical Landmark Marker NO. 1011 at the site reads:
"NO. 1011 FRANK LLOYD WRIGHT TEXTILE BLOCK HOUSES (THEMATIC), ENNIS HOUSE - This house was designed by Frank Lloyd Wright and built in 1924 for Charles and Mabel Ennis. It is one of four textile block houses registered as Landmark No. 1011."

See also
Los Angeles Historic-Cultural Monuments in Hollywood
List of Registered Historic Places in Los Angeles
Storrer, William Allin. The Frank Lloyd Wright Companion. University Of Chicago Press, 2006,  (S.217)

References

External links

URL archived at: The Ennis House - Frank Lloyd Wright, Los Angeles 1924
The Ennis House at (HABS), 1969 Historic American Buildings Survey
LA.Curbed.Com restoration coverage
 (in Italian)

Frank Lloyd Wright buildings
Los Angeles Historic-Cultural Monuments
California Historical Landmarks
Houses on the National Register of Historic Places in Los Angeles
Houses completed in 1924
Modernist architecture in California
Mayan Revival architecture
Los Feliz, Los Angeles